Brown pitohui may refer to either of two species of passerine bird:
 Morningbird (Pachycephala tenebrosa), endemic to Palau
 White-bellied pitohui (Pseudorectes incertus), endemic to New Guinea

Birds by common name